Ashjerd (also known as Ashgerd and Ashkjerd) is a village in Abarj Rural District, Dorudzan District, Marvdasht County, Fars Province, Iran. At the 2006 census, its population was 1,270, in 260 families.

References 

Populated places in Marvdasht County